The Stykovochnyy Otsek, GRAU index 316GK, otherwise known as the Mir docking module or SO, was the sixth module of the Russian space station Mir, launched in November 1995 aboard the . The module, built by RKK Energia, was designed to help simplify space shuttle dockings to Mir during the Shuttle-Mir programme, preventing the need for the periodic relocation of the Kristall module necessary for dockings prior to the compartment's arrival. The module was also used to transport two new photovoltaic arrays to the station, as a mounting point for external experiments, and as a storage module when not in use for dockings.

Development

The docking module originated in the 1992 design version of the cancelled Mir-2 space station, which featured a combined docking compartment and airlock to facilitate docking missions during the Soviet Buran space shuttle programme (this module, SO-1, was eventually incorporated into the Russian Orbital Segment of the International Space Station as Pirs). When the Shuttle-Mir programme began, engineers realised that in order to enable US space shuttles to dock to Mir, the Kristall module would have to be relocated to the forward port of the core module and back to its own lateral port each time a shuttle docked, a process which was not only time consuming but would also be entirely reliant on Kristall'''s Lyappa arm, which, should it fail, would prevent any further shuttle missions to the station. Adding a small extension to Kristall, however, would provide the shuttles the clearance they needed to dock without necessitating the relocation of the module on each occasion, and it was decided to base the design of the new module loosely on that of the Mir-2 docking compartment.

Discussions on providing a docking module for the Shuttle-Mir programme began in May 1993 and approval was granted on 1 November, with the draft plan being developed by December. The module consisted of what were essentially two Soyuz TM-16 type Soyuz orbital modules cut in half, with a cylindrical central portion mounted in the center of the two halves which incorporated docking apparatus (the other two halves were not used). An APAS-89 docking port was mounted on each end. Mounting points were also provided for two boxes (containing new solar arrays) and other external experiments, and the module was provided with its own thermal control, television transmission, and telemetry systems. Rather than being covered in a newly-manufactured white thermal blanket, the module was flown with an unusual orange blanket, which was selected from pre-existing stock for financial reasons. Development of the simplified module was given priority over the more complex Mir-2 type SO-1, and the flight model, the first to make use of NASA's new Space Station Processing Facility, was delivered to Kennedy Space Center on 7 June 1995 alongside the new solar arrays which were to be launched with it.

The module resembles the pressure hull for the cancelled Science Power Platform intended for Mir-2 and the International Space Station, the test article for which was turned into the Rassvet Mini-Research Module 1 and launched in 2010 aboard Atlantis, on mission STS-132.

Solar arrays & MEEP

In addition to simplifying space shuttle docking missions, Mir's docking module was also used as a carrier for two new photovoltaic arrays, mounted to the module in boxes, which were later deployed on Kvant-1 during spacewalks. The first, the Mir Cooperative Solar Array, was jointly designed by NASA and Russia in order to test designs for the future International Space Station. The array was 42 m² in area, and provided 6.7 kW of power when installed on the station during expedition EO-21 in 1996. The array consisted of 42 US-built panels arranged in a 2.7 m (9 ft) wide and 18 m (59 ft) long array mounted to a Russian-built frame, and was instrumented to provide data for models being used to design the solar arrays for the ISS. The second array was the Russian-built MSB array, which had originally been intended to be launched as part of Priroda before the redesign of the module deleted it. It was installed on Kvant-1 during EVA 5 of EO-24, replacing the Kristall'' array which had previously been mounted there.

The module was also used as a mounting point for the Mir Environmental Effects Payload (MEEP), a set of four experiments intended to study the effects of space debris impacts and exposure to the space environment on a variety of materials. The materials used in the experiments were being considered for use on the ISS, and by exposing them at a similar orbital altitude to that flown by the station, the experiments provided an assessment of the performance of those materials in a similar space environment. MEEP also fulfilled the need to examine the occurrence and effects of man-made debris and natural micrometeoroids through capture and impact studies. The experiments were installed on the docking module during STS-76, and retrieved during STS-86.

Docking missions

See also

 Pirs (ISS module)
 Poisk (ISS module)
 Rassvet (ISS module)

References

Mir
Spacecraft launched in 1995
Spacecraft which reentered in 2001